Humble Quest is the third studio album by American country music singer and songwriter Maren Morris. The album was released on March 25, 2022, through Columbia Nashville. The album earned three nominations at the 65th Annual Grammy Awards, including for Best Country Album, while the lead single "Circles Around This Town" was nominated for Best Country Song and Best Country Solo Performance.

Composition and themes 
Morris is a co-writer on all eleven tracks, collaborating with Sarah Aarons, Julia Michaels, Ryan Hurd, Natalie Hemby, Hillary Lindsey, Lori McKenna and Liz Rose. Production was handled by Greg Kurstin. In an interview by NPR, Morris explained the meaning and title of the project:"I always thought that was such an interesting word, because it does mean that you're grounded and you don't have a big head about something – but I think that for me, over the last two years, that word has changed. I think it means you're the closest to your compass that you've ever been. It's not for public consumption of how relatable you are. [...] I think taking that power back with that word is why I wrote the song "Humble Quest" – how it's going to be an ongoing conversation and journey and will probably never end. And I'm okay with that. We're all just awkwardly feeling our way through this weird world."The song “What Would This World Do” is a tribute to Michael Busbee, the producer who worked on each of Morris’ previous records and died from brain cancer in 2019.

Release and promotion
The album's lead single "Circles Around This Town" was released on January 7, 2022. "I Can't Love You Anymore" was released as the album's second single on September 26, 2022.

Reception 

Sam Sodomsky by Pitchfork defined the album "creatively adventurous" pointing out that "the gentle approach of Humble Quest feels antithetical to the dominating trends of today’s pop music", because in the album "Morris sounds mostly pleased to be herself". Writing for Consequence Mary Siroky find out that it is "a more organic record than its predecessor; [...] attributes both to the no-pressure timeline while writing the tracks and the distance from Nashville" and that the album "offers chances for longtime listeners to enjoy some of the things for which Morris has become so beloved" as of "authenticity, massive vocals, and a bit of lyrical playfulness". Billboard wrote that the production is "intimacy permeates the often subtle" witch let the "listener into different corners of her world" becoming "her most inviting work".

Accolades

Track listing
All tracks are co-written by Morris and produced by Greg Kurstin.

Personnel
Adapted from liner notes.

Rich Hinman - pedal steel guitar
Ryan Hurd - background vocals
Greg Kurstin - acoustic guitar, bass guitar, drums, electric guitar, Fender Rhodes, Hammond organ, keyboards, percussion, piano, Wurlitzer
Bennett Lewis - dobro, mandolin
Julia Michaels - background vocals on "Circles Around This Town"
Maren Morris - lead vocals, background vocals

Commercial success 
Humble Quest makes the Guinness World Records for most first-day and first-week streams for a country album by a female artist on Amazon Music.

Charts

References

2022 albums
Columbia Records albums
Maren Morris albums